The 2017–18 Georgia State Panthers men's basketball team represented Georgia State University during the 2017–18 NCAA Division I men's basketball season. The team's head coach was Ron Hunter, who was in his seventh season at Georgia State. The Panthers played their home games at the GSU Sports Arena in Atlanta, Georgia as members of the Sun Belt Conference. They finished the season 24–11, 12–6 in Sun Belt play to finish the regular season in second place. The Panthers defeated Troy, Georgia Southern, and UT Arlington to become champions of the Sun Belt tournament. As a result, they received the Sun Belt's automatic bid to the NCAA tournament. As the No. 15 seed in the West region, they lost to Cincinnati in the first round.

Previous season 
The Panthers finished the 2016–17 season 20–13, 12–6 in Sun Belt play to finish in second place. They lost in the semifinals of the Sun Belt tournament to Troy before receiving an invitation to the CIT, where they lost to Texas A&M Corpus Christi.

Offseason

Departures

Incoming transfers

2017 recruiting class

Roster

Source

Preseason
 Georgia State was picked to finish second in the Sun Belt Conference preseason coaches poll.
 Sophomore, D'Marcus Simonds, was named to the All-Sun Belt Preseason Second Team.
 On November 6, 2017, D'Marcus Simonds was named to the Lute Olson National Player of the Year Award preseason watchlist.

Regular season
 During the November 10th game vs. Carver Bible College, D'Marcus Simonds became the first player in Georgia State history to earn a triple-double, scoring 20 points while adding 10 assists and 10 rebounds.
 On November 20, in a 68–50 win over Eastern Washington, Ron Hunter earned the 400th win of his career.
 D'Marcus Simonds was named to the Lute Olson National Player of the Year Award mid-season watchlist.
 On January 20, in an 83–66 win over Georgia Southern, Isaiah Williams scored his 1,000th career point.
 In a win at Little Rock on February 3, Devin Mitchell set a new scoring record for the Jack Stephens Center with his career-high 38 points.
 On March 5, D'Marcus Simonds was named Sun Belt Player of the Year, along with All-Sun Belt First Team honors. And junior, Devin Mitchell, was named to the All-Sun Belt Third Team.

Post season
 On March 10, in GSU's semifinal win over Georgia Southern, Simonds scored his 689th point– breaking R. J. Hunter's single-season scoring record.
 After the 2018 Sun Belt Tournament, D'Marcus Simonds was named the Tournament MVP.
 D'Marcus Simonds and Isaiah Williams were named to the Sun Belt All-Tournament team.
 Sophomore, Simonds, was named the Georgia Men's College Co-Player of the Year.
 Simonds earned AP All-America Honorable Mention.
 Simonds was named to the Lou Henson All-America team and a finalist for the Lou Henson Award.
 Coach Ron Hunter was awarded the Gene Bartow Award.

Sun Belt Tournament

After locking in the second seed in the Sun Belt Tournament, the Panthers' performance dipped in the last part of their regular season– dropping four of their final six games. Able to shake free of that trend, Georgia State would beat Troy handily in the second round, 73–51, after losing to them twice in the regular season. 
In their semifinal game, the Panthers were once again pitted against in-state foe, Georgia Southern. The teams split their regular season contests– each winning at home. On this neutral court, GSU would defeat the Eagles 73–67 and eliminate their rival from the SBC Tournament for the second time in four years. This rivalry game wouldn't end without some theatrics– with less than a minute to play, Georgia Southern cut State's lead to just three points. The Panthers held the ball while the shot clock ran down to two seconds, at which point the Eagles were called for a kicked ball off of an attempted Georgia State pass. As a result, the shot clock would reset to 20 seconds– with just 23 seconds left on the game clock. The Panthers called a time out, where Coach Hunter said he reminded his team of the new shot clock differential and instructed them to hold the ball until fouled should they successfully inbound the ball. Once play resumed, the inbound pass was received by junior Devin Mitchell, who would later claim he thought Coach Hunter was talking about the game clock, and therefore still thought only two seconds remained on the shot clock, leading him to immediately turn around and shoot the ball from outside of the three-point arc and sink an unnecessary three-pointer. This mishap would ice the game, sending the Panthers to the SBC Tournament finals. Meanwhile, top-seeded (and regular season champions) Louisiana dropped their semifinal game to 5th seed UT-Arlington, sending the Mavericks, a team Georgia State lost to just five games earlier, to face the Panthers in the finals.
The Panthers would handle UT-Arlington in the finals with relative ease, beating them 74–61, with the help of D'Marcus Simonds' game-high 27 points. Their SBC Tournament victory would give the Panthers the Sun Belt Conferences' automatic bid to the NCAA tournament. Selected as a 15-seed, Georgia State was matched with the 2nd-seeded Cincinnati Bearcats for their opening game in Nashville, TN.

Schedule and results

|-
!colspan=9 style=| Exhibition

|-
!colspan=9 style=| Non-conference regular season

|-
!colspan=9 style=| Sun Belt Conference regular season

|-
!colspan=9 style=| Sun Belt tournament

|-
!colspan=9 style=| NCAA tournament

References

Georgia State Panthers men's basketball seasons
Georgia State
Georgia State